This is the list of games based on the Sanrio-Sega Sammy Holdings franchise Jewelpet, organized by the system they were originally released. Years listed indicate the time of the games' first availability.

Nintendo DS

Nintendo 3DS

Arcade

References

External links
 Jewelpet: Cute Magical Fantasy Official Website
 Jewelpet: Magical DS Kirapi Karin Official Website
 Jewelpet: Let's play Together in the Room of Magic! Official Website
 Jewelpet: Magical Rhythm Yay! Official Website
 Jewelpet: Magical Dance in Style☆Deco! Official Website
 Jewelpet: Cooking at the Magical Cafe! Official Website
 Jewelpet: The Glittering Magical Jewel Box Official Website

Jewelpet
Jewelpet
Sanrio video games